The LG Cup Africa is an exhibition association football tournament that took place in Marrakech, Morocco. 

The participants were:

Final table

Results

Winner

Scorers
 2 goal
  Samuel Eto'o
 1 goal
  Eyong Enoh
  Benoît Angbwa
  Nordin Amrabat
  Muhannad El Tahir
  Mike Sserumaga

References

International association football competitions hosted by Morocco
2011–12 in Moroccan football
2011 in Cameroonian football
2011–12 in Ugandan football
2011 in Sudanese sport